I Remember You is a live solo album by pianist John Hicks which was recorded in 2006 shortly before Hick's death and released on the HighNote label. The album was released posthumously in 2009.

Reception
Allmusic reviewed the album stating "An underrated genius of jazz piano if ever there was one, Hicks died before reaping the ultimate rewards and high praise he deserved, so this CD not only reflects a certain melancholy, but celebrates what an original jazz interpreter he truly was... Where Hicks was primarily an ensemble performer, it's good to hear him alone and together with his beloved piano, making subtle and substantive music from the heart".

Track listing 
 "Reflections" (Thelonious Monk) - 7:11
 "I Remember You" (Victor Schertzinger, Johnny Mercer) - 11:04 	
 "A Nightingale Sang in Berkeley Square" (Eric Maschwitz, Manning Sherwin) - 3:38 	
 "All of You" (Cole Porter) - 1:59
 "Solar" (Miles Davis) - 8:40
 "I Want to Talk About You" (Billy Eckstine) - 3:25
 "Everytime We Say Goodbye" (Porter) - 6:49
 "Upper Manhattan Medical Group" (Billy Strayhorn) - 4:09
 "Nutty" (Monk) - 8:46

Personnel 
John Hicks – piano

References 

John Hicks (jazz pianist) live albums
2009 live albums
HighNote Records live albums
Solo piano jazz albums